The Journal of Horticultural Sciences is a biannual peer-reviewed open-access scientific journal covering all branches of horticulture. It is published by the Society for Promotion of Horticulture and it publishes review articles, research papers, and short communications.

Abstracting and indexing
The journal is abstracted and indexed in:
Biological Abstracts
BIOSIS Previews
CAB Abstracts
Emerging Sources Citation Index
Food Science and Technology Abstracts
Scopus

References

External links

Agricultural journals
Biannual journals
Publications established in 2006
English-language journals